Anna George is an Indian-born American actress. She earned an undergraduate degree from Wellesley College and an MBA from Columbia Business School, and worked in finance.

Filmography

References

External links

Living people
American television actresses
Place of birth missing (living people)
American film actresses
Columbia Business School alumni
Wellesley College alumni
Year of birth missing (living people)
21st-century American women